Egerton Grey Country House Hotel was an AA four star listed hotel located near the Bristol Channel in Barry in the Vale of Glamorgan, south Wales. It was located near Cardiff International Airport. The house was originally built in the 17th century and functioned a rectory for some time. It opened as a luxury hotel in 1988 and retained its Edwardian bathrooms, open fireplaces, and antique furnishings including paintings and porcelain, The hotel had 10 ensuite rooms, with many of the rooms containing their Victorian or Edwardian appearances with four-poster posters etc. 
The hotel has been featured in the Doctor Who universe twice, once in the series one serial of The Sarah Jane Aventures, 'Eye of the Gorgon' and again in a series four episode of Doctor Who, 'Turn Left'. The two appearances are not related however, in Sarah Jane Adventures it was a care home for the elderly and in Doctor Who it was as a hotel for Donna Noble's family.
The hotel closed for business in 2010.

References

Hotels in Wales
Buildings and structures in Barry, Vale of Glamorgan
Country houses in Wales
Houses in the Vale of Glamorgan
1988 establishments in Wales
Economy of the Vale of Glamorgan
Clergy houses in Wales
Country house hotels